São Gabriel da Cachoeira (Saint Gabriel of the Waterfall) is a municipality located on the northern shore of the Rio Negro River, in the region of Cabeça do Cachorro, Amazonas state, Brazil.

Location

São Gabriel da Cachoeira is the third largest municipality in Brazil by territorial area, and the second largest in Amazonas. It is also the northernmost city of Amazonas, and part of its territory is within the Pico da Neblina National Park. However, the peak itself is located in Santa Isabel do Rio Negro, and São Gabriel da Cachoeira is in the lowlands. It is not far from the equator, and the climate is correspondingly hot and humid.

The city is served by São Gabriel da Cachoeira Airport.

The municipality contains the  Morro dos Seis Lagos Biological Reserve, created in 1990.
The reserve is within the  Balaio Indigenous Territory, approved in 2009.
The municipality also contains the  Cué-cué/Marabitanas Indigenous Territory, declared in 2013.
It contains the greater part of the  Alto Rio Negro Indigenous Territory, created in 1998.

Demography

Most of the inhabitants of São Gabriel da Cachoeira are indigenous people. The city's population is somewhere around 13,000, but the entire region has 46,303 people (2020), scattered over 109,185 km2, mostly indigenous peoples in surrounding tribes and villages.

Most of the non-indigenous residents of the city are affiliated with the Brazilian army, usually serving a term of two years or more.

Source: Census 2010

History
The City was founded in 1668 as an aldea by Franciscan Friar Teodósio da Veiga and Captain Pedro da Costa Favela on the Rio Negro, near the mouth of the Rio Aruím. In 1761, a fort was built on the location, and the settlement became the town of São Gabriel da Cachoeira.
Between 1952 and 1966, it was officially called Uaupés, after the nearby Vaupés River.

In 2003, Nheengatu became an official language along with Portuguese in São Gabriel da Cachoeira.

Climate

See also
Roman Catholic Diocese of São Gabriel da Cachoeira

References

External links

Municipalities in Amazonas (Brazilian state)
Populated places established in 1668
Populated places on the Rio Negro (Amazon)
1668 establishments in the Portuguese Empire